Pabna Textile Engineering College is a textile institute in Pabna, Dhaka, Bangladesh and is affiliated by the Bangladesh University of Textiles. It is located in the Pabna Sadar area of Meril Bypass, Shalgaria.  It's a government and  the most ancient textile institution in Bangladesh. It is also directly regulated by Ministry of Textiles and jute, in Bangladesh.

Library: There are different types of book are organized in PTEC library around 8000+ books in the library.

Mosque: A Mosque are situated in PTEC near the administrative building.

Hall: There are two boys hall one is named Seikh Rasel Hall and another is Bonde Ali Mia hall. One is ladies hall . Ladies hall is fully residential but boys hall partial residential.

Laboratory:

 Combed Yarn Manufacturing lab.
 Carded Yarn Manufacturing lab
 Woven fabric manufacturing lab.
 Knitting fabric manufacturing lab.
 Apparel manufacturing lab. 
 Physics lab.
 Chemistry lab.
 Textile Testing and quality control lab
 Dyeing lab 
 Electrical lab

Department:

B.Sc. in Textile Engineering consist of different specialization which are

 Dept. of Wet Process Engineering.
 Dept. of Fabric Engineering.
 Dept. of Yarn Engineering.
 Dept. of Apparel Engineering.

History
During the British colonial rule in 1915, a weaving school was established at Pabna to meet textile technician education by offering an artisan-level course. It was named Pabna Government Weaving School. The governor of Bengal visited the institution on 25 January 1926.

It was upgraded to Pabna District Textile Institute in 1980 to offer a two-year certificate course in Textile Technology. In 1994, the institute was promoted to conduct a three-year diploma course in Textile Engineering under the Bangladesh Technical Education Board.

The Prime Minister of Bangladesh reorganised the institution from the Textile Engineering College in 2006,  offering a four-year bachelor's degree in Textile Engineering by affiliation with the University of Rajshahi, and renamed it as  Pabna Textile Engineering College .

See also
Bangladesh University of Textiles 
Textile Engineering College, Chittagong

References

Textile schools in Bangladesh
Education in Pabna District
1915 establishments in India
Engineering universities and colleges in Bangladesh
Universities and colleges in Pabna District
Colleges affiliated to Bangladesh University of Textiles